Hugh Frederic Bennett (10 November 1862 – 26 July 1943) was an English cricketer, who played two first-class games for Worcestershire in 1901. He made 24 and 31* on his debut against Gloucestershire, but after scoring just 8 in the following game against Derbyshire he never played again.

He also played county cricket below first-class level for Shropshire in three matches between 1891 and 1897, while playing at club level for Oswestry.

He was born in Pirton, Pershore, Worcestershire; he died in the same county at Elmley Castle, Malvern, aged 80. He was educated at Bradfield College and Oxford University and became a Church of England clergyman.

References

External links 
 

1862 births
1943 deaths
English cricketers
People from Pershore
Worcestershire cricketers
Cricketers from Worcestershire